Silvia Luna Rodríguez (born 3 November 1956) is a Mexican politician from the New Alliance Party. From 2006 to 2009 she served as Deputy of the LX Legislature of the Mexican Congress representing Aguascalientes.

References

1956 births
Living people
Politicians from Aguascalientes
Women members of the Chamber of Deputies (Mexico)
New Alliance Party (Mexico) politicians
21st-century Mexican politicians
21st-century Mexican women politicians
Deputies of the LX Legislature of Mexico
Members of the Chamber of Deputies (Mexico) for Aguascalientes